Bruno Boni (13 May 1915 – 30 March 2003) was an Italian rower who competed in the 1948 Summer Olympics.

He was born in Cremona. In 1948 he won the bronze medal with his partner Felice Fanetti in the coxless pairs event.

References

1915 births
2003 deaths
Italian male rowers
Olympic rowers of Italy
Rowers at the 1948 Summer Olympics
Olympic bronze medalists for Italy
Sportspeople from Cremona
Olympic medalists in rowing
Medalists at the 1948 Summer Olympics
European Rowing Championships medalists